is a district within Suginami Ward of Tokyo in Japan. Historically it formed a unitary village of Kami-Ogikubo together with modern-day Kamiogi district of Suginami.

Characteristics
The area has Nishiogikubo Station serving the JR Chūō and Sōbu lines. The neighbourhood is primarily residential, and is known to have a high concentration of shops specialised in antique curiosas and second-hand books, as well as establishments that play live music.

Near Nishiogikubo station, the headquarters of the Japanese animation studio Khara, mostly known for its work on the Rebuild Of Evangelion anime series, is located.

Neighbouring municipalities
Musashino City
Mitaka City
Nerima Ward

Major institutions

 Oomiya-mae Kasuga Jinja (shrine)
 Nishiogikita municipal library
Igusa Hachimangu (shrine)
 Tokyo Woman's Christian University
 Sekine public swimming pool
 Tokyo Aviation College
 Ogikubo Junior High School

External links
 Nishiogiology urban studies research site
西荻ナビ 

Neighborhoods of Tokyo
Suginami